1992 Thai general election may refer to;

 March 1992 Thai general election
 September 1992 Thai general election